The 9th congressional district of Illinois covers parts of Cook, Lake, and McHenry counties as of the 2021 redistricting which followed the 2020 census. All or parts of Chicago, Evanston, Glenview, Skokie, Morton Grove, Niles, Northfield, Prospect Heights, Wilmette, Buffalo Grove, Hawthorn Woods, Wauconda, Island Lake, Long Grove, Lake Barrington, Algonquin Township, Cary, Crystal Lake, Lake in the Hills, Lakewood, Oakwood Hills, Trout Valley, Algonquin, Port Barrington, Barrington Hills, and Fox River Grove. It is anchored in Chicago's North Side, along Lake Michigan, and covers many of Chicago's northern suburbs. Democrat Jan Schakowsky has represented the district since January 1999.

The district is one of the most reliably Democratic districts in Chicago, and in all of Illinois. It has been in Democratic hands without interruption since 1949, and for all but six years since 1935.

Composition as of 2023

As of the 2020 redistricting, this district will still be based largely in Chicago's Far North Side and northern Cook County, as well as now parts of southwest Lake County and southeast McHenry County.

The 9th district takes in the Chicago neighborhoods of Rogers Park and West Ridge; most of Uptown; and part of Lincoln Square.

Outside of the Chicago city limits, the district takes in the Cook County municipalities of Evanston, Glenview, Skokie, Morton Grove, and Niles; most of Northfield and Prospect Heights; and half of Wilmette south of Lake Ave.

Lake County is split between this district, the 5th district, the 10th district, and the 11th district. The 9th and 5th districts are partitioned by partitioned by the Fox River, Kelsey Rd, W Miller Rd, Echo Lake Rd, Sacomano Meadows Pond 1, Midlothian Rd, N Old Henry Rd, N Quentin Rd, Lake Zurich Rd, Twin Orchard Country Club, Mundelein Rd, Hicks Rd, Bridgewater Farm, Crossing Pond Park, and Arlington Heights Rd.

The 9th, 10th, and 11th districts are partitioned by Buffalo Grove Golf Course, Buffalo Grove Rd, Arboretum Golf Club, W Half Day Rd, Promontory Ridge Trail, Port Clinton Rd, Mundelein Rd, Highland Pines Park, Diamond Lake Rd, Breckinridge Dr, N Midlothian Rd, Illinois Route 60, W Hawley St, N Chevy Chase Rd, Steeple Chase Golf Club, W Lakeview Parkway, N Gilmer Rd, Hawley St, W Ivanhoe Rd, Liberty St, High St, Kimball Ave, E Liberty St, S Church St, Bangs St, W Liberty St, Westridge Dr/N Lakeview Cir, Carriage Hill Ct/Wood Creek Dr, Greenleaf Ave, Ridge Rd/Burr Oak Ln, and E Burnett Rd/Northern Ter. The 9th district takes in the municipalities of Buffalo Grove; most of Hawthorn Woods; and part of Wauconda, Island Lake, Long Grove, and Lake Barrington.

McHenry County is split between this district and the 11th district. They are partitioned by E Crystal Lake Ave, Meridian Ln, Crystal Lake Country Club, Woodscreek Park, Boulder Ridge Country Club, and Fairway View Dr. The 9th district takes in the entirety of Algonquin Township, which includes the municipalities of Cary, Crystal Lake, Lake in the Hills, Lakewood, Oakwood Hills, and Trout Valley; north Algonquin; and part of Port Barrington, Barrington Hills, and Fox River Grove.

Recent statewide election results 
The district has a Cook Partisan Voting Index score of D +20.

Recent election results

2012

2014

2016

2018

2020

2022

List of members representing the district

Historical district boundaries

See also
Illinois's congressional districts
List of United States congressional districts

References

 Congressional Biographical Directory of the United States 1774–present

External links
Washington Post page on the 9th District of Illinois
U.S. Census Bureau - 9th District Fact Sheet

09
Congress-09
Constituencies established in 1853
1853 establishments in Illinois